The Slovenian Supercup 1996 was a football match that saw the 1995–96 PrvaLiga champions, Gorica, face off against the Slovenian Cup winners, Olimpija. The match was held on 31 July 1996 at the Sports Park in Nova Gorica.

Match details

See also
1995–96 Slovenian PrvaLiga
1995–96 Slovenian Cup

Slovenian Supercup
Supercup